Paul Rowe (born 1 July 1941) is a former Australian rules footballer who played with North Melbourne in the Victorian Football League (VFL).

Rowe later played with Coburg in the Victorian Football Association.

Notes

External links 

Paul Rowe's playing statistics from The VFA Project

Living people
1941 births
Australian rules footballers from Victoria (Australia)
North Melbourne Football Club players
Coburg Football Club players